Luetzelburgia (common names include sucupira and angelim) is a genus of flowering plants in the legume family, Fabaceae. It belongs to the subfamily Faboideae. It was traditionally assigned to the tribe Sophoreae, mainly on the basis of flower morphology; recent molecular phylogenetic analyses assigned Luetzelburgia into an informal, monophyletic clade called the "vataireoids". Keys for the different species of Luetzelburgia have been published.

References

Faboideae
Fabaceae genera